The spatharokoubikoularios ("sword-chamberlain") was a Byzantine court dignity reserved for eunuch palace officials. He was a ceremonial sword-carrier assigned to the personal guard of the Byzantine emperor. It later became a simple court rank, being the third-lowest dignity for eunuchs, coming after the ostiarios and before the koubikoularios. According to the Klētorologion of 899, the insigne of the rank was a gold-handled sword.

References

Sources

 
 

Byzantine palace offices
Byzantine titles and offices reserved for eunuchs
Swordfighters